The 1957–1958 Asian flu pandemic was a global pandemic of influenza A virus subtype H2N2 that originated in Guizhou in Southern China. The number of excess deaths caused by the pandemic is estimated to be 1–4 million around the world (1957–1958 and probably beyond), making it one of the deadliest pandemics in history. A decade later, a reassorted viral strain H3N2 further caused the Hong Kong flu pandemic (1968–1969).

History

Origin and outbreak in China 
The first cases were reported in Guizhou of southern China, in 1956 or in early 1957. Observers within China noted an epidemic beginning in the third week of February in western Guizhou, between its capital Guiyang and the city of Qujing in neighbouring Yunnan province. They were soon reported in Yunnan in late February or early March 1957. By the middle of March, the flu had spread all over China.

The People's Republic of China was not a member of the World Health Organization at the time (not until 1981), and did not inform other countries about the outbreak. The United States CDC, however, contradicting most records, states that the flu was "first reported in Singapore in February 1957".

In late 1957, a second wave of the flu took place in Northern China, especially in rural areas. In the same year, as response to the epidemic, the Chinese government established the Chinese National Influenza Center (CNIC), which soon published a manual on influenza in 1958.

Outbreak in other areas 

On 17 April 1957, The Times reported that "an influenza epidemic has affected thousands of Hong Kong residents". The same day The New York Times reported that local press estimated at least 250,000 persons were receiving treatment by that time, out of the colony's total population of about 2.5 million. The recent influx of about 700,000 refugees from mainland China had intensified authorities' fears of epidemics and fires due to crowded conditions, and according to a report received by the US Influenza Information Center on 3 May, the disease was said to be occurring mainly among these refugees.

By the end of the month (or as early as February), Singapore also experienced an outbreak of the new flu, which peaked in mid-May with 680 deaths. The only National Influenza Center reporting data to the World Health Organization for the southeast-Asian region in 1957 was located in Singapore, and thus the country was the first to notify the WHO on 4 May about an extensive outbreak of the flu which "appeared to have been introduced from Hong Kong". By the end of May, the outbreak had spread across Mainland Southeast Asia and also involved Indonesia, the Philippines, and Japan. In Taiwan, 100,000 were affected by mid-May.

India suffered a million cases by June. In late June, the pandemic reached the United Kingdom.

By June 1957, it reached the United States, where it initially caused few infections. Some of the first people affected were US Navy personnel at destroyers docked at Newport Naval Station and new military recruits elsewhere. The first wave peaked in October and affected mainly children who recently returned to school after summer break. The second wave, in January and February 1958, was more pronounced among elderly people and so was more fatal.

United States

Background 
Since the 1918 pandemic, epidemiological infrastructure in the US had expanded considerably. The Armed Forces Epidemiological Board and its Commission on Influenza were established in 1941, marking the beginning of the Armed Forces' involvement in the control of influenza. Among other activities, the Board maintained surveillance of influenza-like illness around the world, operating 176 stations by 1957. The Commission on Influenza also conducted studies into vaccination, which was considered "the only really effective control measure available in combating influenza".

The Communicable Disease Center (today the Centers for Disease Control and Prevention) was formed in 1946 initially for the control of malaria within military installations in the southeastern US. In light of developing Cold War–era concerns over biological warfare, the Epidemic Intelligence Service was created in 1951 at the CDC as a combined service and training program in the field of applied epidemiology, with the purpose of investigating certain disease outbreaks, among other activities.

The 1950s were a tumultuous time in public health in the US. After the incidence of poliomyelitis in the US reached a peak in 1952, the first vaccine against it was licensed in 1955. Its rollout that year was marred by an incident in April involving Cutter Laboratories, one of the manufacturers of the inactivated vaccine, in which some lots of its vaccine actually contained live virus, resulting in tens of thousands of vaccine-derived infections and tens of cases of paralytic polio. Oveta Culp Hobby, the first secretary of the Department of Health, Education, and Welfare, quit in July (though she claimed that her intention to resign went back to January and was so that she could care for her ailing husband, former Governor of Texas William P. Hobby). Marion B. Folsom replaced her on 1 August.

This vaccine incident reportedly strained the relationship between Hobby and the Surgeon General, Leonard A. Scheele. Hobby relegated the entirety of federal responsibility in the vaccine program to the Surgeon General, not the Secretary of Health, Education, and Welfare. After being sworn in for a third term in April 1956, with no public indication of his intentions, Scheele resigned on 1 August to work at a pharmaceutical company. On 8 August, his successor, Leroy E. Burney, was sworn in as the eighth Surgeon General.

On 20 January 1957, Dwight D. Eisenhower and Richard Nixon were sworn in for a second term as president and vice president respectively.

National response 
The notion that an influenza pandemic was developing in the Far East first occurred to American microbiologist Maurice Hilleman, who was alarmed by pictures of those affected by the virus in Hong Kong that were published in The New York Times, on 17 April 1957. Hilleman was then head of the Department of Respiratory Diseases at the Walter Reed Army Institute of Research. He immediately sent for virus samples from patients in the Far East, and, on 12 May, the first isolate was sent out to the vaccine manufacturers as soon as they all arrived in the US.

The Office of the Surgeon General became aware of the situation in Asia on 20 May. Burney was out of the country at the time, representing the US at the Tenth World Health Assembly in Geneva. The Deputy Surgeon General, W.P. Dearing, spread the word and established special liaison with the National Institutes of Health on Burney's behalf.

On 22 May, after working "around the clock" for the last five days, Hilleman's team reported that the viruses isolated in the Far East were type A but antigenically quite distinct from previously known strains. Hilleman predicted an epidemic would strike the US when schools reopened in the fall. The microbiologist was thereafter instrumental in stimulating the development of the pandemic vaccine.

The day after Hilleman's announcement, the Division of Foreign Quarantine began to monitor travelers from the Far East for signs of respiratory illness. All Epidemic Intelligence Service officers and all relevant personnel at the CDC were alerted of the priority of investigating cases and outbreaks of influenza-like disease at that time.

The Public Health Service formally began its participation in the national effort against the flu on 28 May. The Surgeons General of the military called a meeting with the Service to discuss the control of the novel influenza. The disease was noted for its mild presentation though high rates of attack in various settings. It was the opinion of those at the meeting that the virus was already in the US, but no epidemic was expected until the fall. It was recommended that the Department of Defense purchase about 3 million doses of monovalent vaccine targeting the pandemic virus. The Commission on Influenza was asked to propose the composition of the polyvalent vaccine to be used as well.

The following day, the director of the National Institutes of Health, Justin M. Andrews, having consulted with CDC Director Robert J. Anderson, submitted a memo that recommended, among other items, that the monovalent pandemic vaccine needed for the Department of Defense be licensed, that state epidemiologists be alerted to watch for outbreaks of influenza-like illness, that EIS officers immediately investigate any reported outbreak, and that "the role of influenza vaccine as a public health measure be carefully studied...".

On 31 May, Dearing reflected on the 1918 pandemic and how new strains of influenza emerge, "presumably by mutation", which may spark another pandemic at any time. In writing, he indicated his support for a mass immunization program, saying that, if epidemiologists did find the present situation "unusual or almost unique", then the burden of proof would shift to opponents of such a program. He asked the principal staff officers to explore whether "the investment of the few million dollars necessary" to organize an immunization campaign would be advisable, if the situation indeed justified it.

World Health Organization's response 
The 1957–1958 pandemic was the first influenza pandemic to occur since the creation of the World Health Organization in 1947. Memories of the 1918 pandemic were still ever-present. In recognition of the worldwide threat of epidemic influenza, the WHO launched its Global Influenza Programme in 1947 with the establishment of the World Influenza Centre at the National Institute for Medical Research in London. This eventually gave rise to the Global Influenza Surveillance Network in 1952 to facilitate global scientific collaboration and fulfil the objectives of the programme.

In 1957, China was not a member of the WHO, and thus it was not a part of its influenza surveillance network. Therefore, it took several weeks, if not months, for the news of an outbreak to reach the WHO, when the virus had already spread into Hong Kong and then to Singapore. This fact would be lamented repeatedly after the pandemic, and it was taken as reinforcement of the importance of a "truly worldwide" network of epidemiological surveillance.

Following this delay, things then "moved swiftly". After receiving the report out of Singapore in early May, the WHO reported on the developing outbreak for the first time in its Weekly Epidemiological Record published on 10 May. Within three weeks laboratories around the world had concluded that the cause of these epidemics was a new variant of influenza A. This information was first reported in the Weekly Epidemiological Record for 29 May.

On 14 June, the WHO declared that attempts at large-scale quarantine were "as costly as they are ineffective", instead recommending only that acute cases be isolated. It reiterated that all reports it had received emphasized the mildness of the disease in most cases, with the very few deaths having occurred mainly in elderly victims suffering from chronic bronchitis.

The need for a single, consistent name for the novel virus became clear as it continued to spread and became more commonly discussed. Up to this point, the causative agent had mostly been called "Far East influenza virus" or "Far East strain (influenza virus)" or even "Oriental flu", though "Asian influenza" had been used before. On 11 July, the question was finally taken up at an informal meeting of scientists during the Fourth International Poliomyelitis Congress in Geneva. There it was agreed that  "Asian influenza" was a "descriptive and appropriate" name for the "contemporary manifestation of the ancient disease", as the term "Far East" was considered "not exact as to geographical location".

On 23 July, the WHO issued a circular letter advising that surplus vaccine be made available to poorer countries at the "lowest economic price".

On 16 August, William J. Tepsix, commander of Pennsylvania's Veterans of Foreign Wars in the United States, sent a letter to United Nations Secretary-General Dag Hammarskjold demanding an investigation into whether the virus had been released by the Soviet Union or China. It is not clear if the UN or the WHO ever responded to Tepsix's letter. However, US Surgeon General Leroy E. Burney would later dismiss this notion on 26 August in response to a similar question raised by the press.

On 11 October, the WHO announced that the virus had spread to all populated parts of the world aside from "a few islands or territories having no contact with the outside world".

Following the main phase of the pandemic in 1957, the WHO reflected on its performance as part of its review of the first ten years of the organization in 1958. It concluded that "the WHO influenza programme fulfilled the major task allotted to it", which allowed "many parts of the world to organize health services to meet the threat and for some countries to attempt to protect priority groups by vaccination". However, it acknowledged that had its influenza surveillance network been "truly worldwide", as it would repeatedly lament it was not, then preparations could have begun two months earlier.

Vaccine

Background 
In December 1942, Dr. Thomas Francis, Jr., and his colleagues on the United States Armed Forces' Commission on Influenza (including Jonas Salk, future developer of the inactivated polio vaccine) began a series of key studies into the use of inactivated influenza virus vaccines, which for the first time demonstrated the protective effect of such vaccines against infection. Similar studies into their efficacy and safety continued until 1945, when the first inactivated virus vaccine entered the market for commercial use. In the fall of that year and the spring of 1946, the entirety of the Armed Forces received the inactivated virus vaccine.

During the winter of 1946–1947, a worldwide influenza epidemic occurred, an event that for some time was itself considered a pandemic due to its global distribution albeit low mortality. Vaccines that had been effective during the 1943–1944 and 1944–1945 seasons suddenly failed during this epidemic. It was found that the influenza A virus had undergone significant antigenic drift, resulting in a virus that was quite antigenically distinct, but not one of an entirely new subtype. This experience demonstrated the necessity to alter vaccine composition to match newly circulating strains.

In the winter of 1950–1951, a severe influenza epidemic ravaged England and Wales, the number of weekly deaths at one point even surpassing that of the 1918 pandemic in Liverpool. Public health experts in the US, fearing the implications of the outbreak on their country, decided to impose a challenge on themselves: to see how quickly the British virus could be imported into the US, its antigenic structure analyzed, and then incorporated into a new vaccine, if the virus were found to be distinct from preexisting strains. Upon receipt of the strains at the laboratories at Walter Reed Army Institute of Research and the National Institute of Allergy and Infectious Diseases, which then sent samples to the vaccine manufacturers, the two government laboratories were able to produce the required 1 liter of vaccine of "acceptable potency, sterility, and safety" in three weeks; the manufacturers were soon to follow. The exercise was considered a success by those involved, but it was recognized that a repeat performance in the future might not be so likely without the same factors in their favor. Out of this exercise came a list of recommended priority groups from the civilian occupational population to be inoculated in the event of an emergency.

In 1954, the Armed Forces initiated routine annual vaccination against the flu, considered the "only really effective measure available in combating" the virus, but the Public Health Service did not recommend a comparable regimen to the general public. This was based on the relatively short-lived demonstrated immunity of the vaccines and the lack of certainty that the strains used in the polyvalent vaccines then would be the cause of epidemics in the future. However, this policy would be reexamined in light of the pandemic three years later.

Pandemic vaccine 
After reading of the epidemic underway in Hong Kong, Maurice Hilleman immediately sent for samples of the virus from patients in the Far East, which were collected in late April 1957 and received at the Walter Reed Army Institute of Research before the middle of May. The Division of Biologics Standards of the US Public Health Service released the first of the virus cultures, designated A/Jap/305/57, to vaccine manufacturers on 12 May 1957. An immediate issue encountered with the new variant was in choosing the isolate optimally adaptable to producing necessary virus growth in chick embryos. After study of the five isolates in total, it was concluded that none in particular would be chosen for production, but each manufacturer would use whichever isolate showed the best growth characteristics.

Hilleman's team reported its finding of the antigenic novelty of the virus on 22 May after working "around the clock" for the last five days. Hilleman predicted an epidemic would strike the US when schools reopened in the fall.

The Public Health Service formally began its participation in the effort against the flu on 29 May with a meeting with the Surgeons General of the military. The nature of the disease was discussed, and it was recommended that the Department of Defense purchase about 3 million doses of monovalent vaccine targeting the pandemic virus. The Commission on Influenza was asked to propose the composition of the polyvalent vaccine to be used as well. The following day, Justin M. Andrews, Director of NIH, having consulted with CDC Director Robert J. Anderson, submitted a memo that recommended, among other items, that the monovalent pandemic vaccine needed for the Department of Defense be licensed.

On the last day of May, reflecting upon the experience of the 1918 pandemic, Acting Surgeon General W.P. Dearing indicated his support for a mass immunization program, if epidemiologists were to find the present situation "unusual or almost unique", in which case the burden of proof would shift to opponents of such a program. He asked the principal staff officers of the Office of the Surgeon General to explore whether "the investment of the few million dollars necessary" to organize an immunization campaign would be advisable, if the situation indeed justified it.

Vaccine production was underway before the start of June. After receiving its samples on 23 May, for example, Merck Sharp & Dohme had produced "laboratory quantities" of pandemic vaccine within two weeks. Before the middle of June, the first experimental lots had been produced and promptly entered into testing at the National Institutes of Health, which was expected to take about two weeks. The first 90 volunteers from among PHS personnel were inoculated with the experimental vaccine on 18 June.

On 5 June, the Assistant to the Surgeon General called a meeting with representatives of the three bureaus of the Service. The associate director of NIH reported that the technical problem in the production of the monovalent vaccine had been resolved and that it could be ready in September, with a polyvalent vaccine including the novel strain ready a month later. He advised that certain groups receive the monovalent vaccine at the same time as the Armed Forces, basing his priorities on the list produced following the 1951 exercise. It was made clear that this would not require any additional funding. The deputy chief of the Bureau of State Services then recommended that the Surgeon General form an advisory council of public health officials, physicians, and the manufacturers; his vision was one of the Public Health Service advocating for mass inoculation, which would necessitate extra funds.

The first meeting of the Advisory Committee on Influenza occurred on 10 June. One general finding of this meeting was that since limited data suggested the existing polyvalent vaccine was not protective against the novel variant, an effective monovalent vaccine should be produced immediately. Existing polyvalent vaccine should be utilized as otherwise recommended. Furthermore, the present situation did not yet justify establishing priorities for civilian use or considering any federal subsidy in producing the vaccine. Following this meeting, Surgeon General Burney held a press conference, where he discussed the vaccine. He shared the Department of Defense's consideration of purchasing 4 million doses of the monovalent vaccine — enough to vaccinate the entire Armed Forces, estimated at 2.8 million. He made clear that production of the monovalent vaccine would occupy the manufacturers, and so they would not be able to produce both the monovalent and the polyvalent vaccines at the same time. He also shared the committee's recommendation that if only 4 million doses could be produced over the next six weeks, they should go to the Armed Forces.

The second phase of the Public Health Service's Asian Influenza Program began with a meeting of technical representatives of the manufacturers with NIH on 12 June. The manufacturers were presented with the latest epidemiological information, including data on the virus isolates and their growth characteristics. Here each company's experience with the different strains used in production was also summarized, and they ultimately agreed to review their inventories and report a potential formula that would make best use of available materials. This same day, the State of New York announced its plan to start a pilot project to produce pandemic vaccine, authorized by Governor W. Averell Harriman.

On 20 June, an associate director of NIH laid out various alternatives for the course of the virus in the US and how to respond to each: an explosive outbreak before 1 September, with either continued low mortality or increased virulence (vaccination would not be possible, except for the use of limited polyvalent vaccine supplies and possible use in 1958); sporadic local activity during the summer with an explosive outbreak in the winter, again with low mortality (vaccinate priority groups) or increased virulence (maximize vaccine production, vaccination would be required, and priority groups would receive it first); or sporadic local activity during the summer with normal incidence in the winter (no recommendation of vaccination). It was generally agreed that the most likely outcome would be closer to the second possibility, with sporadic local activity during the summer with an epidemic in the fall or winter, with little increase in lethality. It was also clear then that the quantities of vaccine necessary for large-scale inoculation would not be ready until after the middle of August, but if the epidemic held off until the fall and winter, as was considered likely, it would be possible protect a significant part of the population. This framework was later presented to the Secretary Folsom of Health, Education, and Welfare on 24 June.

On 26 June, Burney met with representatives of the American Medical Association to discuss the virus and how best to employ medical manpower against a serious epidemic. The vaccination situation was also discussed, as well as the variety of federal responses envisioned by the Service. Although it was emphasized that the present situation did not appear to justify large-scale orders or subsidization of production by the federal government, the parties agreed up a partnership between the Public Health Service and the American Medical Association with the purpose of public health education. It was recognized that the public had heard much about the novel virus but had not heard a thing about how to protect itself against it.

In 1957, six pharmaceutical companies were licensed to manufacture influenza vaccine: Merck Sharpe & Dohme, Eli Lilly & Co., Parke, Davis & Co., Pitman-Moore Co., National Drug Company, and Lederle Laboratories. As members of the pharmaceutical industry, they had participated in the effort since the day the Public Health Service sent them samples of the virus. Maurice Hilleman happened to be close to the industry, and he helped secure the initial involvement of the manufacturers, going to them directly to spur development and avoiding "the bureaucratic red tape" that might typically forestall manufacture of new pharmaceutical products. In the latter half of June, following a series of outbreaks of the novel virus aboard naval vessels docked on the East Coast, the Department of Defense provided a significant stimulus to commercial production by placing an order for 2,650,000 ml of monovalent vaccine.

After Merck's production of "laboratory quantities" of vaccine by early June and the product's entry into clinical trials in the middle of June, initial batches from four other manufacturers, including Pitman-Moore Co. and Eli Lilly & Co., were sent to NIH in early July. By this time, Pitman-Moore had received a government contract for about half a million doses while Eli Lilly had not, though Lilly confirmed it would be moving ahead with production on a "preparedness basis".

The Public Health Service announced the establishment of specifications in the manufacture of the pandemic vaccine, which were then sent to the manufacturers, on 10 July. Service officials that day also met with the Executive Committee of the Association of State and Territorial Health Officers in Washington, D.C., where the flu situation was discussed. The officers agreed with the proposed PHS-AMA partnership to launch a public health education campaign, specifically one that urged vaccination against the flu. At this time, influenza vaccines had generally been used by large companies to protect their employees, but with the threat of a probable, large-scale outbreak, stimulating their broader use seemed advisable.

With the middle of July came the need finally to make two key policy decisions: whether to recommend vaccination again the flu for the general public and whether to recommend to the manufacturers to continue production of the monovalent vaccine then intended only for military use or to recommend they shift to making a polyvalent vaccine incorporating the novel variant for use by the general public. As to the first question, such a recommendation was considered medically justified, but the necessary quantities of vaccine had never been produced so quickly. Beyond providing for its own employees and patients, PHS ruled out any purchasing of vaccine itself. To the end of ensuring adequate supply for the general public, Burney spoke to each of the manufacturers by telephone from 15 July through 19 July. They could see the need, "from the standpoint of public health", to vaccinate as much as one-third of the population, and given the predictions of an epidemic and the plans already being developed by public health officials, they agreed to make a sizable investment in vaccine production without any aid from the federal government.

As to the second question, NIH believed that a polyvalent vaccine was preferable immunologically speaking, but the manufacturers were unsure they could produce large amounts of an effective polyvalent vaccine on the timeline envisioned. On the other hand, a monovalent vaccine would become preferable if the virus itself were to become significantly deadlier. Therefore, the wisest recommendation seemed to be for a monovalent vaccine for use by the general public once the needs of the Armed Forces had been satisfied.

Burney ultimately made these decisions, but they were not necessarily set in stone. With the unpredictability of influenza well recognized, it was considered judicious to "hedge" any policy in favor of reducing a potential rise in mortality, were it to occur. The Division of Biologics Standards therefore outlined a set of facilities that could be used to shore up production if the situation worsened. A mandatory allocation system for distribution and appropriation of funds for the purchase of vaccine and for public vaccination clinics were considered feasible if circumstances ultimately justified them.

The vaccine entered trials at Fort Ord on 26 July and Lowry Air Force Base on 29 July.

At the beginning of August, PHS gave the go-ahead to the press to initiate its public health education campaign. Burney met with press to warn of "the very definite probability" of a widespread epidemic in the fall or winter. He shared that the manufacturers had agreed to working "triple shifts", every day of the week, to produce 8 million doses by the middle of September, of which half would go to the Armed Forces. The ultimate target was 60 million doses by 1 February. It was made clear that there would not be enough time to produce enough vaccine to inoculate a majority of the country before the flu season, but vaccination, as "the only known preventive" against the flu, was viewed as the best course of action. When asked about the potential for mass immunization programs like those against polio, Burney stated that these would be the states' responsibility, but he conceded that "you could probably get more immunized in a shorter period" that way. The principal reason against such a policy was, apparently, that "that isn't the ordinary way we do things in this country."

On 2 August, representatives of the Armed Forces, the Veterans Administration, and PHS met to discuss the question of vaccine dosage. It was the opinion of the Office of the Surgeon General, upon review of studies thus far reported, that 1 cc (cubic centimeter) of monovalent vaccine, with a strength of 200 CCA units, would be "the most effective and practical dosage". This was five times the strength of the pilot vaccine initially announced on 10 July. This potency was selected in light of difficulties during the early-summer trials in obtaining high yields of the virus in embryonated eggs, with any strength greater than 200 CCA seeming unlikely.

On 9 August, Burney recommended to the Office of the Surgeon General that export of the pandemic vaccine be controlled while supplies were limited. The next day, PHS announced its plans for a "nationwide battle" against the anticipated flu outbreak that fall and winter. Beginning in September, a mass education campaign would call for the public to get vaccinated through various media such as the press, radio, and television.

On 12 August, Burney sent individual letters to each of the manufacturers requesting their cooperation with PHS in a "voluntary system of equitable interstate allocations" of the pandemic vaccine while supplies remained limited. They all agreed. This plan was later announced on 16 August, with the purpose of such a system being to ensure "an equitable availability of vaccine supplies throughout all parts of the country". The manufacturers were acknowledged as having "informally" shown a willingness to follow the system while vaccine remained scarce. In short, each state would receive shipments of a fraction of a lot of vaccine from each manufacturer equal to the proportion of that state's population to the population of the entire country. Burney emphasized that the Service "would not contemplate any allocation between public agency purchasers and commercial sales."

The first lot of 502,000 doses of vaccines was released on 12 August. Almost immediately, issues with allocation became glaringly obvious. In Washington, D.C., physicians reported of an intensely worried public, asking more about the "Asiatic flu" than any other epidemic disease that any could recall. They feared that such pressure might bring about a black market around the vaccine (though Daniel L. Finucane, Director of the District Department of Health, doubted such a possibility). Nevertheless, Time reported that National Drug Co. and Lederle Laboratories had sent their initial doses to companies across the country, leaving it to them to distribute the shots, and that indeed individual doctors had begun vaccinating "favored patients". At the same time, the NFL's Chicago Cardinals were able to announce that the entire team would be vaccinated against the flu.

The pandemic vaccine became relevant for the Eisenhower administration not long after the first doses were released. White House Press Secretary James Hagerty would report that two doses had been sent to Secretary of the Interior Fred A. Seaton by PHS. However, Seaton decided beginning his inoculation was not necessary before his trip to Hawaii. On 21 August, a spokesperson for the Department of Agriculture had to deny the speculation that the use of millions of eggs necessary for vaccine production would "skyrocket" the price of eggs. That same day, President Eisenhower was asked whether he would receive the pandemic vaccine. He replied, "I am going to take it just as soon as ordinary people like I am can get it."

Eisenhower later met with his chief economic advisor, Gabriel Hauge. On 22 August, Hauge was sent home ill. That same day, Burney stated that the president was "an essential person" and should get vaccinated immediately, a recommendation with which Eisenhower's personal physician, Major General Howard McCrum Snyder, "agreed completely". On 24 August, Burney made the pointed recommendation that those with a history of heart or lung conditions be vaccinated early. (Eisenhower had suffered a heart attack in September 1955.) Notably, he assured Snyder that there was sufficient vaccine in the district to cover this priority group. Finally, based on Burney's recommendation the preceding weekend, Eisenhower was vaccinated on 26 August, the injection administered by Snyder. Hagerty reported that all members of the White House who worked closely with the president would thereafter be vaccinated.

That same week, the Association of State and Territorial Health Officers convened in Bethesda, Maryland, and Washington, D.C., beginning on 27 August for a two-day special meeting to discuss the pandemic response. Among other recommendations pertaining to preparing for a likely epidemic, the Committee on Vaccination Promotion outlined how such programs should be carried out and who should be prioritized for inoculation. The primary objective for any such program was considered "to prevent illness and death from epidemic influenza within the limits of available vaccine." The committee sided with PHS's informal agreement with the manufacturers that they participate in a "voluntary" system of interstate allocation. It was plainly acknowledged that "influenza vaccine is being manufactured and will becoming increasingly available but is not yet available for everyone"; therefore, PHS would recommend to civilian physicians that they prioritize those working in essential services maintaining the health of the community, those maintaining other basic services, and those considered to be at "special medical risk". It was stated that the pandemic vaccine had been approved for use in children as young as three months, with the following recommendations for administration: Children three months to five years of age would receive a two-dose regimen of 0.1 cc each, spaced over one to two weeks; children five to 12 years of age would receive a similar two-dose regimen but of 0.5 cc each; and children 13 years of age and older would receive the same dosage as for adults, a single, 1.0-cc injection. Finally, it was resolved that the two vaccination programs, that against polio and now that against influenza, "be continued as independent and parallel programs."

The second lot of 562,610 doses was released on 28 August, bringing the total to 1,149,610 doses for both military and civilian use. Burney shared the expectation that, based on the current pace of production, it was possible that 80 to 85 million doses would be ready by 1 January, 20 million doses more and one month sooner than originally anticipated. The Armed Forces announced their intention to give two injections to each servicemember, and thus their order had increased from 4 million doses to over 7 million.

Just as after release of the first batch of vaccine, issues with supply and allocation quickly became apparent yet again. Although authorities like the New York County Medical Society and wholesalers in Washington, D.C., made clear that vaccine would not be available for the public until September or even October, there was still intense demand for the vaccine. A physician's secretary in the district reported in The Evening Star that her office was receiving "dozens" of calls every day from anxious patients. This was not helped by Burney's statement days before, that there was sufficient vaccine in the district to vaccinate those with heart and lung conditions, such as the president. Even the State Department had not received any vaccine, and it was reportedly unknown when it would. Interestingly, in contrast to the D.C. situation, doctors in New York City reported that they had been asked about the vaccine, but the pressure was nowhere near that for the Salk polio vaccine when it had been in short supply.

On 31 August, a spokesperson for National Drug stated that D.C. physicians had been "very well taken care of" with respect to vaccine. Finucane, the district health director, immediately pushed back on this claim, saying that he knew of "no large shipments of the vaccine into Washington" and that those who had received any were "lucky". Meanwhile, the pharmaceutical company had been very responsive to the demands of industrial concerns such as Bell Telephone, E. I. duPont de Nemours & Co., Inc., and Pennsylvania Railroad. One district physician decried this state of affairs as "grossly unfair"; similarly, Dr. I. Phillips Frohman, a former chairman within the American Medical Association, labeled it "criminal". However, the company defended its distribution practices by asserting it was "trying to get as much of the vaccine out as possible."

Ironically, The Star's reporting on National Drug's statement regarding vaccine supply and Finucane's pushback, with the headline "Doctors Here Receive Vaccine for Patients", seemed to stimulate demand even more, according to physicians. J. Hunter Stewart, chief of the Information Office of the Office of the Surgeon General, clarified that there was no federal priority system beyond PHS's recommendations that the vaccine be distributed equitably and that it first go to healthcare providers. He emphasized: "But you must remember that these are recommendations."

This insistence upon the voluntary nature of vaccine allocation was not satisfying to all. On 3 September, Dr. Thomas E. Mattingly wrote into The Star to thank it for debunking National Drug's statement and to discuss the situation in general. He described PHS's establishment of a system of priorities as "very wise" but asserted that it was "not enough to panic the public and not provide dependable discipline and guarantee a system of priorities". He called on the federal government to "accept both responsibility and purposeful leadership" and PHS to seize every last dose of vaccine and distribute it itself. The government would also reimburse the companies "for the fair cost of all vaccine they have been urged to manufacture." Others echoed this call for some "special action of one vague kind or another" by the federal government, just as had been advocated for during the early days of the Salk vaccine, but such policies seemed doubtful with an administration that two years before had dismissed free polio shots for children as "socialized medicine by the back door".

Aftermath 
The number of deaths peaked the week ending 17 October, with 600 reported in England and Wales. The vaccine was available in the same month in the United Kingdom. Although it was initially available only in limited quantities, its rapid deployment helped contain the pandemic. Hilleman's vaccine is believed to have saved hundreds of thousands of lives. Some predicted that the U.S. death toll would have reached 1 million without the vaccine that Hilleman called for.

H2N2 influenza virus continued to be transmitted until 1968, when it transformed via antigenic shift into influenza A virus subtype H3N2, the cause of the 1968 influenza pandemic.

Virology and clinical data 

The strain of virus that caused the Asian flu pandemic, influenza A virus subtype H2N2, was a  recombination of avian influenza (probably from geese) and human influenza viruses. As it was a novel strain of the virus, the population had minimal immunity. The reproduction number for the virus was around 1.8 and approximately two-thirds of infected individuals were estimated to have experienced clinical symptoms.

It could cause pneumonia by itself without the presence of secondary bacterial infection. It caused many infections in children, spread in schools, and led to many school closures. However, the virus was rarely fatal in children and was most deadly in pregnant women, the elderly, and those with pre-existing heart and lung disease.

Mortality estimates

In October 1957, Leroy Edgar Burney told The New York Times that the pandemic is mild and the case fatality rate (CFR) is below "two-thirds of 1 per cent", or less than 0.67%. After the pandemic, information from 29 general practices in the UK estimated 2.3 deaths per 1,000 medically attended cases. A survey based on randomly selected families in Kolkata, India, revealed that there were 1,055 deaths in 1,496,000 cases. On the symposium of Asian influenza in 1958, a range of CFR from 0.01% to 0.33% was provided, most frequently in between 0.02% and 0.05%. More recently, the World Health Organization estimated the CFR of Asian flu to be lower than 0.2%. In the US pandemic preparedness plan, the CDC estimated the CFR of 1957 pandemic to be 0.1%. The estimated CFR from first wave morbidity and excess mortality in Norway is in between 0.04% and 0.11%. Other scholars estimated the CFR near 0.1%.

The flu may have infected as many as or more people than the 1918 Spanish flu pandemic, but the vaccine, improved health care, and the invention of antibiotics to manage opportunistic bacterial infections contributed to a lower mortality rate.

Most estimates of excessive deaths due to the pandemic range from 1-4 million, some of which include years beyond 1958. In particular, the attempt by the National Institutes of Health in 2016 attributed global mortality 1.1 million (0.7 to 1.5 million) excess deaths to the pandemic, including the year 1959. This estimate of global burden has recently been adopted by the World Health Organization and US CDC. The study also estimated the excess deaths in the first year of the pandemic, in 1957, to be 0.6 million (0.4 to 0.8 million).

By country 
 According to US CDC, two estimates of excess deaths, 70,000 and 116,000, are provided. The first estimate refers to the 1957–1958 flu season while the higher estimate is multi-year totals from 1957 to 1960.
 An estimated 33,000 deaths in the United Kingdom were attributed to the 1957–1958 flu outbreak. The disease was estimated to have a 3% rate of complications and 0.3% mortality in the United Kingdom.
 In West Germany, around 30,000 people died of the flu between September 1957 and April 1958.
 According to the 2016 study in The Journal of Infectious Diseases, the highest excess mortality occurred in Latin America.

Economic effects

The Dow Jones Industrial Average lost 15% of its value in the second half of 1957, and the U.S. experienced a recession. In the United Kingdom, the government paid out £10,000,000 in sickness benefit, and some factories and mines had to close. Many schools had to close in Ireland, including seventeen in Dublin.

References

Further reading

 
 

1957 disease outbreaks
1958 disease outbreaks
History of Guizhou
Influenza pandemics
20th-century epidemics
Epidemics in India